The New Zealand Portrait Gallery Te Pūkenga Whakaata hosts the biennial Adam Portraiture Award competition, New Zealand's premier portrait prize. The first competition was held in 2000 as the National Portrait Competition, and since 2002 has been funded by the Adam Foundation. Since 2006, the winning entry has become part of the Gallery's permanent collection.

Winners

References

New Zealand art awards
2000 establishments in New Zealand